Josip Barić (born 2 July 1994) is a Dutch football player of Croatian descent who plays for FC Emmen.

Club career
He made his professional debut in the Eerste Divisie for FC Emmen on 7 August 2015 in a game against FC Oss.

References

External links
 

1994 births
Dutch people of Croatian descent
Footballers from Split, Croatia
Living people
Dutch footballers
FC Emmen players
Eerste Divisie players
Association football midfielders